Markarian 335, also known as the Moving Nebula, is a Seyfert galaxy containing a supermassive black hole, located 324 million light-years away in the constellation of Pegasus.

The central black hole in this active galaxy nucleus is notable for its corona's spinning rate (at about 20 percent the speed of light) and its change in brightness from 2007 to 2014.  The geometry of the corona has been deduced from relativistic blurring of the reflection of the accretion disc.  An x-ray flare in 2013 is interpreted as an aborted jet.

Gallery

References 

Pegasus (constellation)
Supermassive black holes
Seyfert galaxies
Markarian galaxies